Sabi River may refer to:

 Sabi or Sahibi River, in Rajasthan, Haryana and Delhi states in India
 Sabi or Save River (Africa), in Zimbabwe and central Mozambique

See also
 Sabie River, in South Africa and southern Mozambique